Z.A. Shamsul Haq was appointed as the first CMM-Chief Metropolitan Magistrate of Dhaka Bangladesh in 1979. He served as the Chief of Dhaka Metropolitan Magistracy for over a decade and retired in 1988, but continues to work as an adviser to the Bangladesh Scouts. His book, Handbook for Magistrates, was published in 1990 and acts as a guide for other Magistrates. Contact sms # 8801711520997(youngest son)

References 

Living people
1929 births